George John James Hamilton-Gordon, 5th Earl of Aberdeen (28 September 1816 – 22 March 1864), styled Lord Haddo before 1860, was a British peer and Liberal Party politician.

Early life
Lord Haddo was born at Bentley Priory in Hertfordshire, the eldest son of the 4th Earl of Aberdeen and Harriet Hamilton, Dowager Viscountess Hamilton (née Harriet Douglas), widow of James Hamilton, Viscount Hamilton and granddaughter of James Douglas, 14th Earl of Morton. He was educated at Harrow School and Trinity College, Cambridge.

Marriage
On 5 November 1840, he married Mary Baillie (a sister of the future 10th Earl of Haddington) at Taymouth Castle. They had six children:
 George Hamilton-Gordon, 6th Earl of Aberdeen (1841–1870); died unmarried.
 Mary Hamilton-Gordon (1844–1914); married Walter Hepburne-Scott, 8th Lord Polwarth.
 James Henry Hamilton-Gordon (1845–1868); committed suicide, which was passed off as a rifle accident, in his rooms in Cambridge.
 John Campbell Hamilton-Gordon, 1st Marquess of Aberdeen and Temair (1847–1934)
 Harriet Hamilton-Gordon (1849–1942); married William Lindsay.
 Katherine Eliza Hamilton-Gordon (1852–1931); married Alexander Bruce, 6th Lord Balfour of Burleigh.

Career
His uncle, William Gordon, had retired as Member of Parliament for Aberdeenshire in 1854 and Haddo put himself forward as his successor. However, Haddo had contracted what was probably tuberculosis, and he went to Egypt to spend a few months in a warm climate. Despite being absent from Scotland and not having canvassed the constituency, Haddo won the election and returned to take his seat in the House of Commons, in good health, a year later. He left the Commons after inheriting his father's title in 1860 and made a second trip to Egypt. Aberdeen had previously converted to Evangelicalism and it was in Egypt that he campaigned for the Coptics to convert to his own faith.

Aberdeen later returned to Scotland and died at his home, Haddo House, in 1864. He was buried at Methlick and was succeeded by his eldest son, George. His last words were (when asked how he felt) "Perfectly comfortable". Hamilton-Gordon donated a large collection of antiquities that his father had collected to the British Museum in 1861.

References

External links 

 
 

1816 births
1864 deaths
British evangelicals
Converts to evangelical Christianity
Alumni of Trinity College, Cambridge
People from Hertfordshire (before 1965)
Children of prime ministers of the United Kingdom
05
02
Scottish Liberal Party MPs
Members of the Parliament of the United Kingdom for Scottish constituencies
People educated at Harrow School
UK MPs 1852–1857
UK MPs 1857–1859
UK MPs 1859–1865
UK MPs who inherited peerages